Miglianico (Abruzzese:) a town and comune of the province of Chieti in the Abruzzo region of Italy.
 
Miglianico is situated in the foothills of the Italian Apennine Mountains.

History
Miglianico developed as a burgh around the early medieval rocca (Castle), around the 10th century AD.

During the World War II, Miglianico was occupied by German forces attempting to hold ground as the American push by General Mark Clark advanced north from Southern Italy. Homes of residents were taken over by German units and used to quarter soldiers and served as command posts. Miglianico and the surrounding area was heavily damaged by Allied carpet bombing during 1944. Many of its residents fled to and lived in caves for months for safety.

Main sights
Sights include the Masci Castle (15th century), and the churches of St. Rocco and St. Pantaleone (the patron saint of the town).

Culture
The Festival of St. Pantaleone is celebrated every year on 27 July, and is the patron saint of doctors and obstetricians.

Miglianico is also host to the Miglianico Tour foot race each year in August.

Economy
The town economy is predominantly agricultural; wine grapes and olives are its primary crops.

People
 Danny Biasone (Miglianico 1909 - Syracuse 1992)

See also
Abruzzo (wine)

References

Cities and towns in Abruzzo